Lafontant may refer to:

 Roger Lafontant, leader of the Tonton Macoutes 
 Jewel Lafontant